Tetracanthus (Greek "four spines") is an epithet for several different species:

 Nandopsis tetracanthus, a fish in the genus Nandopsis
 Neolamprologus tetracanthus, a fish
 Scatophagus tetracanthus, a fish in the genus Scatophagus
 Zelus tetracanthus, an insect in the genus Zelus
 Echinocactus tetracanthus, synonym of Parodia erinacea, a cactus in the genus Parodia